The following is a list of semi-permanent and permanent settlements on the British Overseas Territory of South Georgia and the South Sandwich Islands.

 Corbeta Uruguay base
 Godthul
 Grytviken
 Husvik
 King Edward Point
 Leith Harbour
 Ocean Harbour
 Prince Olav Harbour
 Rosita Harbour
 Stromness

South Georgia and the South Sandwich Islands-related lists